The Paul Schweikher House and Studio at 645 S. Meacham Road in Schaumburg, Illinois is the former home and studio of architect Paul Schweikher. The house, which was designed by Schweikher himself, was built in 1937–38. At the time, Schweikher had achieved prominence through an exhibition at the Museum of Modern Art; he later chaired both the Carnegie Mellon School of Architecture and the Yale School of Architecture and received numerous awards for his work. The house's design blends several of the styles which Schweikher worked in throughout his career, with elements of Prairie School, International, Japanese, and vernacular architecture. The one-story house was built with wood, brick, and glass; the simple materials and low roof helped match the house to its natural environment, a landscape designed by Franz Lipp. The inside of the T-shaped house is divided into sleeping, working, and living areas; the working area, which included Schweikher's studio, is physically separate and connected to the main house by a breezeway. The home's design was praised by contemporary architects, including Ralph Rapson, William Metcalf, and Bertrand Goldberg.

The house was added to the National Register of Historic Places on February 17, 1987.

References

Houses on the National Register of Historic Places in Cook County, Illinois
Houses completed in 1938
Prairie School architecture in Illinois
International style architecture in Illinois
Schaumburg, Illinois